Lushkan (also Romanized as Lūshkān, Looshkan, Lowshkān, and Lūshgān) is a village in Ak Rural District, Esfarvarin District, Takestan County, Qazvin Province, Iran. At the 2006 census, its population was 2,864, in 621 families. This village is populated by Azerbaijani Turks.

References 

maghz rayaneh

Populated places in Takestan County